The 1984 Brisbane Rugby League premiership was the 76th season of Brisbane's semi-professional rugby league football competition. Eight teams from across Brisbane competed for the premiership, which culminated in a grand final match between the Wynnum-Manly and Southern Suburbs clubs.

Season summary 
Teams played each other three times, with 21 rounds of competition played. It resulted in a top four of Wynnum-Manly, Southern Suburbs, Fortitude Valley and Redcliffe.

Teams

Finals

Grand Final 

Wynnum-Manly 42 (Tries: D. Green 2, W. Green, B. French, B. Walsh, W. Lewis, G. Miles, G. Dowling. Goals: W. Green 5.)

Southern Suburbs 8 (Tries: H. Abbott. Goals: M. Meninga 2.)

Winfield State League 

The 1984 Winfield State League was the third season of the Queensland Rugby League's statewide competition. A total of 14 teams competed in the season, 8 of which were BRL Premiership clubs. The remaining six were regional teams from across the state, hence the State League name. The finals were straight final four series held at QRL headquarters at Lang Park, with Wynnum-Manly and Souths winning their respective semi finals. In the final, the Seagulls defeated Magpies 21-10 to win the first of four straight Winfield State League titles.

References

Rugby league in Brisbane
Brisbane Rugby League season